Aerin Frankel is an American ice hockey goaltender, currently playing with the United States women's national ice hockey team and as a member of the Professional Women's Hockey Players Association. She has been cited as one of the best collegiate goaltenders and a highly promising prospect for the American national team. She won the Patty Kazmaier Award in 2021. She is a two-time recipient of the WHCA National Goalie of the Year award and was the inaugural winner in 2021.

Career 
Raised in Briarcliff, New York, Frankel began skating at the age of four, becoming a goaltender at the age of nine. During high school, she played for Shattuck-Saint Mary's preparatory, winning three national titles and finishing with a 1.10 goals against average, a .945 save percentage, and 39 shutouts.

In 2017, she began attending Northeastern University, serving as the starting goaltender for the university's women's ice hockey programme. She posted a .934 SV% in her rookie collegiate year, leading all NCAA rookies. She then posted a 28-save shutout in opening game of the 2018–19 season, becoming the first goaltender to shutout Boston University since Florence Schelling in 2011. The Huskies would go on to win a second consecutive WHEA Championship that year. In the 2019–20 season, she set Northeastern records for GAA, SV%, shutouts, and wins, her .958 SV% leading the NCAA. She was named a top-10 finalist for the 2020 Patty Kazmaier Memorial Award as well as the Beanpot's best goaltender, and was named Hockey East Goaltender of the Year for the second year in a row.

International career 
Frankel made her senior American national team debut at the 2019-20 Rivalry Series, picking up her first senior international win in December 2019. She was named to the American roster for the 2020 IIHF Women's World Championship before the Championship was cancelled due to the COVID-19 pandemic.

Awards and honors

NCAA
2021 NCAA All-Tournament Team
2021 Patty Kazmaier Award
2019-20 CCM/AHCA First Team All-American
2020-21 CCM/AHCA First Team All-American

Hockey East
ARMY ROTC Hockey East Player of the Week (awarded March 8, 2021) 
2021 Hockey East Goaltending Champion
2021 Hockey East First-Team All-Stars
2021 Hockey East All-Tournament Team 
2021 Hockey East Championship MVP
2021 Hockey East PNC Bank Three Stars Award

Hockey Commissioners Association
WHCA National Goalie of the Year 2021, 2022
Hockey Commissioners Association Women's Goaltender of the Month, November 2019
Hockey Commissioners Association Women’s Goaltender of the Month, January 2021 
Hockey Commissioners Association Women’s Goaltender of the Month, February 2021 
Hockey Commissioners Association Women’s Goaltender of the Month (March 2021)

Personal life 
Frankel studies criminal justice and psychology at Northeastern University.

References

External links

Living people
1999 births
American women's ice hockey goaltenders
Northeastern Huskies women's ice hockey players
Jewish ice hockey players
Ice hockey players from New York (state)
Sportspeople from New York City
People from Briarcliff Manor, New York
Patty Kazmaier Award winners
21st-century American women